is the eighth single of the J-pop idol group Morning Musume, released on January 26, 2000 as an 8 cm CD. It sold a total of 1,229,970 copies making it their second highest selling single and a number-two hit on the Oricon Charts. In 2004, it was re-released as part of the Early Single Box and again in 2005 as a 12 cm CD. The song also makes an appearance in the Japanese Nintendo DS game Osu! Tatakae! Ouendan.

"Koi no Dance Site" is the source of "Sexy Beam", which became a catchphrase for Mari Yaguchi and went on to be referenced in anime and games such as Silent Hill.

It is the only Morning Musume single to date to feature group members contributing to the instrumental backing track, as several of the members can be heard blowing police whistles during the song's choruses and closing moments.

Packaging 
The original 8 cm CD release was housed in a J-card-type 12 cm slimline single case instead of the then-industry CD snap-pack packaging. The case itself was 7 mm thick, showing the artwork through the front, as well as through the spine and part of the back of the case. The CD itself was inserted upside down, allowing the artwork of the disc itself to show through the transparent back of the case. This is one of only two 8 cm CD singles released by Morning Musume to adhere this packaging (the other being their seventh single Love Machine (1999)).

Track listing

8 cm CD 
  – 4:29
  – 5:08
  – 4:25

LP 
  – 4:29
  – 8:07
  – 5:38
  – 6:49

12 cm CD (Early Single Box and individual release)

Members at time of single 
1st generation: Yuko Nakazawa, Kaori Iida, Natsumi Abe
2nd generation: Kei Yasuda, Mari Yaguchi, Sayaka Ichii
3rd generation: Maki Goto

References

External links 
 Entries on the Up-Front Works official website CD, LP, VHS

Morning Musume songs
Zetima Records singles
2000 singles
Song recordings produced by Tsunku
Japanese-language songs
2000 songs
Songs about dancing